Students produce a number of comedy revues at the University of New South Wales in Sydney, Australia each year.  Written and performed by students, the shows comment satirically on current affairs, pop culture, dating and university life. They feature song parodies, short sketches, video segments and dance numbers. The first revue at the university, entitled Low Notes, was organised by the Students' Union in 1956.  The first revue by the UNSW Medical Society Revue, held in 1975, was entitled Rumpleforeskin and was quickly followed by the UNSW Law Revue Society's The Assault and Battery Operated Show.

Shows are typically named with a pun on a then-current pop culture reference: usually a movie but computer games, political slogans, television shows and books have also featured.

Since 1975, revues from the Law, Built Environment and Arts faculties, the School of Computer Science, and the university's Jewish community, have all been held. Notably, the UNSW Law Revue Society's 2020 and the Terrible, Horrible, No Good, Very Bad Law and Justice Revue was the first video revue and the only revue to be held in 2020 due to disruption caused by the COVID-19 pandemic.

Operationally, each of the three largest revues (Med, Law and CSE) is a club affiliated to UNSW Arc and subject to the latter's oversight. Revues retain their institutional memory through 'old revuers', participants who come back year after year. Former directors are often invited back to perform voice-overs and critique shows before they go to stage.

Past shows

Medical Revue

Law Revue

CSE (Computer Science and Engineering) Revue

AUJS Revue

Arts & Social Sciences Revue
An Arts & Social Sciences Revue was held in 2006, entitled It's Time.
Arts Revue returned in 2013 and again in 2014, entitled 10 Things I Hate About Arts Revue

Engineering Revue
An engineering revue was held in 1991 entitled Gorillas On The Piss.

Other shows 

"Best of" revues typically combine selected material from previous shows, sometimes updated or adapted to take into account the intervening period of time. A "Best of" show, featuring material from both Med Revues and Law Revues from the years 1984–1989, was held in the Bondi Pavilion in 1990. The show was called A Fabulous Set of Steak Knives. A "Best of" called Heart Rate High: the Bex Years of Our Lives was held at the Figtree Theatre in 1996, but covered material from Med Revues only from 1990 to 1995. In 1998, a show was put on by revuers off-campus called Dead Fish are Fun, which featured some material from past Law and Med Revues, as well as original material. In 2001, a "Best of" show called Comedy for the Chemical Generation was held at the Figtree theatre covering material from Med Revues 1996–2000.

In 2006, Law & Orderlies, a "Best of" show covering both Med and Law Revue, was held at the Figtree Theatre. The bulk of material was drawn from Revues from 2000 to 2005, however the show also featured sketches from Med Revue 1975, Law Revue 1989, and Law Revue 1998.

In 2011, another "Best of" show was staged, again in the Fig Tree Theatre. The title of the show was "Deja Revue", and featured content mostly from 2006 - 2010 Med & Law Revues. The show had a 4 night run, and sold out every single seat for every single night, before the curtain had even opened on the first night.

In 2012, CSE Revue held their first "Best of" show, featuring the best sketches from the previous 10 shows.

Other revues at the university are held from time to time: students from New College, the Faculty of the Built Environment and the university's Buddhist club organise smaller-scale shows. Sketch comedy shows have also been hosted by the New South Wales University Theatrical Society (NUTS), the UNSW comedy club Studio Four, and other groups.

A medical-student-only production called UNSW Medshow (or sometimes Med Show) was established in 2000 by former Med Revuer Neil Jeyasingam, after the Med Revue stopped donating proceeds to charity, and due to the onerous rehearsal schedule that made it difficult for medical students to participate. Med Show has been held annually since.

UNSW Revue alumni
 Andrew Dyer, cast member and writer for the Seven Network's Big Bite
 Tristan Jepson, cast member and writer for the Seven Network's Big Bite
 Andrew Jones, film and TV writer, and co-creator of Seven Network's Big Bite
 Rick Kalowski, film and TV writer; co-creator of Big Bite and Double Take
 The Hon. Justice Lucy McCallum, Chief Justice of the Australian Capital Territory and former judge of the Supreme Court of New South Wales Matthew "Aiyiah" Lee, co-host on ABC2's Good Game Garry Charny, film producer 'Jindabyne,  and Guarding Charlie, Chairman April Films and Centuria Capital

See also
Revues are also held at:
Australian National University
Macquarie University
University of Sydney

References

External links
 Arts & Social Sciences Revue
 AUJS Revue
 CSE Revue
 Law Revue
 Med Revue
 New College Revue
 Medshow

University of New South Wales student organisations
Australian student comedy